1157 Ruhuna Rebellion, also known as the Rebellion of Queen Sugala, was a revolt led-by Queen Sugala of Ruhuna against the Kingdom of Polonnaruwa ruled by Parakramabahu the Great. The rebellion was suppressed by the army of Parakramabahu, and the kingdom of Ruhuna was annexed as a part of Polonnaruwa in 1158.

Background 
After the death of King Vikramabahu I, his son Prince Gajabha became the king of Polonnaruwa. During this period, the king Kithsirime of Maya Rata and Sri Vallabha of Ruhuna fought against King Gajabahu, but Gajabahu's general Gokanna drove them out.

Keerthi Sri Megha, who ruled Dakkhinadesa during this period, died and his sub-king Parakramabahu ascended to the throne. Shortly after becoming king, Parakramabahu came to Polonnaruwa with a large army and fought and defeated King Gajabahu, but with the intervention of the Sangha Polonnaruwa kingdom was again handed over to King Gajabahu.

Revolt 
After the demise of King Gajaba II, King Parakramabahu became the king of both Maya Rata and Polonnaruwa. But by this time Ruhuna was ruled by King Manabharana II. Shortly afterwards, Manabharana died, and his ministers continued the invasion of Polonnaruwa led before by Manabharana under the leadership of his mother, Sugala Devi. Katuwana was the site of Sugala's “defensive fortifications…for her warriors.”

By all accounts Sugala was a fearless military leader and “the queen had the strong loyalty of the people of the area, and her possession of the Alms Bowl and the Tooth Relic of the Buddha apparently gave her rule legitimacy.”

However, the revolt was suppressed “after a series of savage campaigns.” Eventually Queen Sugala and her totems of power were captured, and Ruhuna was annexed by Polonnaruwa.

Aftermath 
The annexation of Ruhuna united the whole of Sri Lanka under one flag, and this lasted until the death of Parakramabahu the Great in 1187.

Further reading
 Adithiya, L.A.. Search for Sugala. Sri Lanka, Travel Friends, 1980.

References

Bibliography
 Codrington's Short History of Sri Lanka - Chapter IV
 Nishantha Joseph, Sujeewa. Sinhalese Kings (in Sinhala). Jayasinghe Book Publishers. pp. 56–57. .
 Mahavamsa - Queen Sugala of Ruhuna

Polonnaruwa period